Gregory Deyermenjian (born 1949, Boston) is a psychologist and explorer. In 1981 he visited the ruins of Vilcabamba la Vieja at Espíritu Pampa, and then turned his attention to the northeast and north of Cusco, Peru. Since the mid-1980s he has made numerous expeditions to Peru investigating Paititi, a legendary lost city that is part of the history and legend of the western Amazon basin. He is a long-term Fellow of The Explorers Club.

He has participated in extensive explorations and documentation of Incan remains in Mameria (1984, '85, '86, and '89); the first ascent of Apu Catinti (1986); the documentation of Incan "barracks" at Toporake (1989); a traverse of the Incan "Road of Stone" past the Plateau of Toporake (1993); the discovery and documentation of Incan and pre-Incan remains in Callanga (1994); the discovery and first ascent of an Incan complex at base of Callanga's peak "Llactapata" (1995); the first visit, exploration, and documentation of the true nature of Manu's Pyramids of Paratoari (1996); he led a six-man Brazilian/Italian/North American expedition to investigate Roland Stevenson's finds following the Incan "Road of Stone" onto the Plateau of Pantiacolla, discovery of "Lago de Ángel" and its Incan platforms north of Río Yavero (1999); and full investigation of claims that Paititi was to be found on Río Choritiari (2000). 

In June 2004 the "Quest for Paititi" exploration team of Deyermenjian and ongoing expedition partner Paulino Mamani—along with expedition partner from the 1980s, Goyo Toledo—discovered several important Incan ruins along branches of the Incan Road of Stone at the peak known as Último Punto in the northern part of the Pantiacolla region of Peru.

Deyermenjian is featured in the 2015 episode of Expedition Unknown, “City of Gold.”

References

External links
 Quest for Paititi, Deyermenjian's 2004 expedition; previous expeditions
 

Living people
1949 births
American explorers
Fellows of the Explorers Club